Joice Icefall is an icefall draining from the Antarctic polar plateau through the Millen Range into Lensen Glacier. It was named by the southern party of the New Zealand Federated Mountain Clubs Antarctic Expedition, 1962–63, after I. Joice, a field assistant to the party.

References

Icefalls of Antarctica
Landforms of Victoria Land
Borchgrevink Coast